Karmøy is a municipality in Rogaland county, Norway. It is southwest of the town of Haugesund in the traditional district of Haugaland. The administrative centre of the municipality is the town of Kopervik.

Most of the municipality lies on the island of Karmøy. The island is connected to the mainland by the Karmøy Tunnel and the Karmsund Bridge. It is known for its industries, as well as for fishing. Karmøy is also well known in Norway for its beautiful heather moors and the white sand surfing beaches.

The  municipality is the 294th largest by area out of the 356 municipalities in Norway. Karmøy is the 25th most populous municipality in Norway with a population of 42,541, making it one of the largest in the region. The island itself is the 4th most populated island in all of Norway.

General information

The municipality of Karmøy is a recent creation. During the 1960s, there were many municipal mergers across Norway due to the work of the Schei Committee. On 1 January 1965, Karmøy municipality was created upon the merger of two towns and parts of five municipalities into one large municipality with 23,217 residents. The areas that were merged were:
the town of Kopervik (population: 1,737)
the town of Skudeneshavn (population: 1,275)
the whole municipality of Skudenes (population: 3,583)
the whole municipality of Stangaland (population: 2,678)
the whole municipality of Åkra (population: 6,008)
the part of the municipality of Avaldsnes located west of the Førresfjorden (population: 4,153)
most of the municipality of Torvastad (population: 3,783), except for the island of Vibrandsøy which went to Haugesund Municipality

Name
The municipality was named after the island of Karmøy, on which the majority of the municipality is located. The Old Norse form of the name was Kǫrmt. The name is probably derived from  'bargeboard' (here in the sense 'sheltering island'). The last element in the word, øy, means 'island' and was added later.

Coat of arms
The coat of arms was granted on 18 April 1975. The arms are a silver or white diamond interwoven with a cross on a red background. The diamond symbolizes the name Karmøy since the island protects the mainland. The cross symbolizes the historic Avaldsnes Church which was a royal chapel in the Middle Ages.

Churches
The Church of Norway has eight parishes within the municipality of Karmøy. It is part of the Karmøy prosti (deanery) in the Diocese of Stavanger.

History

There are several finds from the Stone Age, Bronze Age and Iron Age. Large burial mounds, stone monuments, and many other ancient monuments are found on the island. Karmøy is the site of the Storhaug, Grønhaug, and Flagghaugen burial mounds.

Karmøy was known for sailing in the old times. The eddic poem Grímnismál says that Thor, the weather god, wades the Karmsundet strait every morning on his way to Yggdrasil, the tree of life. The ocean outside Karmøy is dangerous, filled with underwater currents and rocks. Thus the ships were forced into the narrow Karmsundet. Chieftains and kings controlled the ships passing up and down the coast and demanded taxes.

The Karmsundet strait was also the source of the name of the kingdom, at the time when the first king of the unified Norway, Harald Fairhair, lived on Karmøy. (See History of Norway.)

Avaldsnes is located on the northeastern coast of the island. King Augvald who has given his name to this ancient site is mentioned in the Old Norse sagas as having his home here. Later the residence of Harald Fairhair and other kings are mentioned. There is also a medieval church, St. Olav's church of Avaldsnes, located on this coast.

Visnes, a village in the northwest of Karmøy was once the site of an important copper mine. This mine was source of the copper used for the Statue of Liberty in New York City.

In the 18th century, two girls from Uyea in Shetland rowed to Haaf Gruney to milk some of the cows grazing there. Unfortunately, their return was marred by a strong storm, and eventually they found their tiny boat blown to Karmøy. The Uyea girls ended up marrying Karmøy men, and their descendants still live there. The Dyrland family of Karmoy are believed to be the family that the two girls married into after they arrived on Karmøy. Sivert Dyrland was a member of the Norwegian government in the early 20th century.

Geography

The majority of the municipality is located on the large island of Karmøy, but it also includes the mainland peninsula between the Karmsundet strait and Førresfjorden, plus the island of Feøy and several other small islands.

The natural and cultural landscape is highly heterogeneous, encompassing chalk-white sands, moorland, and several piers around the island. The landscape in the north is mainly agricultural, while large parts of the inland south are heather moors. The island has many white, sandy beaches facing the North Sea, attracting surfers as one of the top spots for windsurfing in Norway.

Towns and villages are mostly located along the coast. The three towns in Karmøy are all on the island, the administrative center Kopervik is on the east side, Åkrehamn is on the west side, while Skudeneshavn is on the southern tip. On the mainland part of Karmøy, the village of Norheim is contiguous with the neighboring town of Haugesund. To the south of Norheim is the village of Vormedal while the village of Kolnes is in the northeastern part of mainland Karmøy. Other villages in Karmøy include Avaldsnes, Eike, Ferkingstad, Sævelandsvik, Sandve, Veavågen, and Visnes.

Haugesund Airport is also located on the island rather than in the town of Haugesund proper. The Geitungen Lighthouse lies at the southern end of the municipality, marking the entrance to the Boknafjorden.

Climate
Karmøy has an oceanic climate (Cfb), also known as marine west coast climate, with rainy winters and warm or mild summers, and a long frost-free season for the latitude. The all-time high  was recorded July 2019, and the all-time low  was set in January 2010 (extremes since 2003). The wettest time of year is autumn and winter, while April–July is the driest season. Haugesund Airport is situated in Karmøy municipality and has been recording since 1975.

Districts
The municipality is divided into 79 circuits, grouped into 10 areas:
 Åkra: Tjøsvoll, Tjøsvoll øst, Åkrehamn, Årvold, Grindhaug, Mosbron, Stong, Ådland, Liknes
 Avaldsnes: Kvalavåg, Visnes, Skeie, Velde, Fiskå, Utvik
 Fastlandssiden: Norheimsvågen, Norheim, Norheimsskogen, Spanne, Røyksund, Fosen, Mykje, Aksnes, Eike, Moksheim, Bjøllehaugen, Trevarden, Vormedal
 Ferkingstad: Stava, Stol/Ferkingstad, Langåker/Kvilhaug, Hemnes/Sandhåland
 Håvik: Østrem, Bygnes, Skår, Sund, Vorå, Kolstø
 Kopervik: Stokkastrand, Nordstokke, Stangeland, Liar, Kalvatre, Kopervik sentrum, Nordre side, Østremneset, Eide, Brekke
 Sevland: Heiå, Mannes, Sevlandsvik, Varne
 Skudenes: Vikra, Sandve, Syre, Breidablikk, Hålandshøgda, Vågen/Varden, Skudeneshavn, Vigevågen, Vik, Falnes, Hillesland, Hovdastad, Snørteland
 Torvastad: Feøy, Hauge, Håland, Osnes, Litlasund, Karmsund, Storesund, Nordbø, Bø
 Vedavågen: Sævik, Østhus, Østhusneset, Munkejord, Vea

Government
All municipalities in Norway, including Karmøy, are responsible for primary education (through 10th grade), outpatient health services, senior citizen services, unemployment and other social services, zoning, economic development, and municipal roads. The municipality is governed by a municipal council of elected representatives, which in turn elect a mayor.  The municipality falls under the Haugaland og Sunnhordland District Court and the Gulating Court of Appeal.

Municipal council
The municipal council of Karmøyis made up of 17 representatives that are elected to four year terms. Currently, the party breakdown is as follows:

Area attractions

 Skude Festival (Skudefestivalen) is an annual festival held during the first week of July in Skudeneshavn. It is the largest gathering of coastal culture in Western Norway with boats of all categories: vintage boats of all categories – old wooden boats, vintage boats, modern boats, sailing boats, tall ships. Craftsmen demonstrate handcrafts from olden days connected to sea and shipping. International and national artists entertain in the evenings. In 2004, Skudeneshavn was voted Norway's summer city by national TV viewers.
 Viking Farm (Vikinggarden) is part of the Nordvegen History Centre, located close to Avaldsnes. The building and use of the farm is an ongoing experimental archaeological research and interpretation programme. The farm includes reconstructed houses.
 Karmøy Museum of Fishing (Karmøy Fiskerimuseum), which opened in 1999 in Veavågen, presents the history of fishing in the region of Karmøy from the 1950s up to the present day. In addition to the main exhibitions there are salt-water aquariums showing the most common types of fish in the area. The Karmøy Fishery Museum is housed in a new building with unique architecture.
 Mælandsgården Museum (Museet i Mælandsgården) is situated in the middle of the old, well preserved part of Skudeneshavn. A town model shows what old Skudeneshavn looked like in 1918.
 Rogaland Fish Museum (Rogaland Fiskerimuseum), located in an old herring salting factory in Åkrehamn, is fully restored to its former glory and housing new exhibitions about the history of this vibrant coastal community. This museum also richly depicts the contact enjoyed between Karmøy and North America.
 Visnes Mining Museum (Visnes Gruvemuseum) provides the history of the rather special mining community that in the 1800s had 3,000 inhabitants. Visnes supplied the copper for the Statue of Liberty in New York City.
 Ferkingstad, an area known for its archaeological finds, from the early Viking period to the late medieval era.

Industry
Norsk Hydro is a large aluminium smelter operator located on the island of Karmøy. These pylons are the tallest electricity pylons in Norway.

Bauer-Nilsen design and produce high-pressure hydraulics located at Karmøy.

International relations

Twin towns – Sister cities
Karmøy has sister city agreements with the following places:
  Mjölby, Sweden
  Vinderup, Denmark
  Hankasalmi, Finland

Notable residents

 King Augvald (7th century AD), semi-legendary king in Norway
 King Ferking (7th century AD), semi-legendary king in Norway
 King Harald Fairhair (c. 850—c. 932), the first king of a united Norway
 Christen Bentsen Schaaning (ca.1611-1679) clergyman, parish priest of Avaldsnes, 1635–1679
 Thormodus Torfæus (1636—1719), Icelandic-born resident of Kopervik, the first Royal Historian of Norway
 Endre Johannes Cleven (1874—1916) promoted the settlement and culture of Norwegian immigrants in Manitoba
 Asbjørn Sunde (1909—1985), communist resistance fighter and leader of the Osvald Group
 Jan Ivar Pedersen (born 1936) a Norwegian professor of nutrition
 Jakob Eng (born 1937) a banker, politician and Mayor of Karmøy in 1980's
 Thorhild Widvey (born 1956) a physical therapist, politician and Govt. minister 
 Leif Johan Sevland (born 1961) politician, Mayor of Stavanger from 1995 to 2011
 Leif Ove Andsnes (born 1970), pianist and chamber musician
 Jostein Grindhaug (born 1973), former football player with 135 caps for FK Haugesund and coach
 Anne Margrethe Hausken (born 1976), orienteering world champion, grew up in Karmøy
 Bjørn Eriksen, (Norwegian Wiki) (born 1983), videogame commentator («Addexio») on YouTube

See also
Karmøens Tidende

References

External links

Municipal fact sheet from Statistics Norway 
 
 Tourist information – from the municipality 
 Karmøy Museum of Fishing
 Mælandsgården
 Karmøy Kulturopplevelser
 Nordvegen History Center

 
Municipalities of Rogaland
1965 establishments in Norway